Danny Moore (born 2 November 1971) is an Australian former professional rugby league footballer who played in the 1990s and 2000s. He also played in England for the Wigan Warriors (with whom he won 1998's Super League III) and the London Broncos.1st player to win a grand final in the Northern and Southern Hemisphere

Playing career

1990s
A Townsville junior, Moore's early career was played in the back row. He joined the Manly-Warringah Sea Eagles as a  forward where he made his first grade début in the round 7 clash of the 1991 NSWRL season against the Parramatta Eels at Brookvale Oval, playing from the bench in Manly's 30-18 win. After spending the rest of the 1991 and all of 1992 playing in Reserve Grade, he was switched to the centres at the start of the 1993 NSWRFL season and became a regular first grader.

Moore moved to the Super League to play for English club Wigan Warriors in 1998, appearing at centre in their 1998 Super League Grand Final victory over Leeds Rhinos.

2000s
Moore shifted to the London Broncos for 2000's Super League V. His final year was the 2001 NRL season in which he played two games for the North Queensland Cowboys.

References

External links
Danny Moore at nqsports.com.au

1971 births
Living people
Australia national rugby league team players
Australian rugby league players
London Broncos players
Manly Warringah Sea Eagles players
North Queensland Cowboys players
Queensland Rugby League State of Origin players
Rugby league players from Townsville
Rugby league wingers
Wigan Warriors players